Transportation Science is a bimonthly peer-reviewed academic journal published by the Institute for Operations Research and the Management Sciences (INFORMS). The studies published in the journal apply operations research techniques to problems in the full range of transportation sectors, including air travel, rail transport, commuter lines, and vehicular travel/traffic.

References

External links 

Operations research
Management science
Business and management journals
English-language journals
Publications established in 1967
Quarterly journals
Transportation journals
INFORMS academic journals